Illar is a Palestinian town in the Tulkarm Governorate in the northern West Bank, located 10 kilometers northeast of Tulkarm, and 25 kilometers east of the Israeli city of Netanya. It is bordered by Attil to the west, Kafr Ra'i to the east, and the Israeli settlement of Hermesh to the north. According to the Palestinian Central Bureau of Statistics, 'Illar had a population of approximately 6,190 inhabitants in 2007. 6.6% of the population of 'Illar were refugees in 1997. The healthcare facilities for the surrounding villages are based in 'Illar, the facilities are designated as MOH level 2.

History
Pottery remains from the Iron Age II, Hellenistic, early and late Roman, Byzantine, early Islamic period and the Middle Ages have been found here.

An ancient inscription written in the Hebrew alphabet was found in 'Illar. The inscription states ‘Tomb of Menashe ben Yannai’. Scholars believe it marked the site of a Jewish or Samaritan tomb dating from the late Second Temple period.

In 1200, during the Crusader era, it was known as Allar. In 1265, it was mentioned among the estates which Sultan Baibars granted his amirs after he had expelled the Crusaders. The whole of Illar was given to his emir Saif al-Din Qushtimur al-'Ajami.

Ottoman era
Illar, like the rest of Palestine, was incorporated into the Ottoman Empire in 1517, and in the  census of 1596 it was a part of the nahiya ("subdistrict") of  Jabal Sami, part of the  Sanjak of Nablus.  The village had a population of 41 households, all Muslim. The villagers  paid a fixed tax-rate of 33,3% on agricultural products, such as  wheat, barley, summer crops, olive trees, beehives and/or goats, in addition to occasional revenues; a total of 5,074  akçe. All of the revenue went to a Waqf.

In 1838 'Ellar  was noted as a village in the esh-Sharawiyeh esh-Shurkiyeh (the Eastern) district, north of Nablus. 

In 1882, the PEF's Survey of Western Palestine described it as "a small village on the side of a hill, with olives and wells."

British Mandate era
In the 1922 census of Palestine conducted  by the British Mandate authorities, Allar had a population of  835, all Muslims, increasing in the 1931 census to 1047  Muslims, in 268 houses.

In the 1945 statistics the population of Illar was 1,450, all Muslims,  with 13,981 dunams of land according to an official land and population survey. 4,432 dunams were plantations and irrigable land, 5,431 used for cereals, while 33 dunams were built-up (urban) land.

Jordanian era
In the wake of the 1948 Arab–Israeli War, and after the 1949 Armistice Agreements, Illar came under Jordanian rule.

In 1961, the population of Illar was 2,499.

Post-1967
Since the Six-Day War in 1967, Illar has been under Israeli occupation. 

After Oslo II Accord in 1995, Illar was placed under Area A of the West Bank under security and civil administration of the Palestinian National Authority.

Footnotes

Bibliography

External links
 Welcome To 'Illar
Survey of Western Palestine, Map 11:    IAA, Wikimedia commons

Towns in the West Bank
Municipalities of the State of Palestine